Aissatou Badji (born 26 December 1980) is a retired Senegalese sprinter who specialized in the 100 metres.

She won a bronze medal in the 4 × 100 metres relay at the 2003 All-Africa Games and at the 2004 African Championships. She also competed individually in the 100 metres at the 2002 African Championships, the 2003 All-Africa Games and the 2004 African Championships without reaching the final.

Her personal best time was 11.95 seconds, achieved in June 2012 in Cagnes.

References

External links

1980 births
Living people
Senegalese female sprinters
Place of birth missing (living people)
African Games bronze medalists for Senegal
African Games medalists in athletics (track and field)
Athletes (track and field) at the 2003 All-Africa Games